Early Tracks is an EP collection of unreleased early recordings by American country/rock band Old 97's. The EP contains four songs from two early singles as well as four more from the Wreck Your Life recording sessions.

Track listing
All tracks by Old 97's

"Ray Charles" – 3:15 
"Crying Drunk" – 3:14 (from "Crying Drunk" single)
"Harold's Super Service" – 2:25 
"W-I-F-E" (Pedal Steel Version) – 3:47 (from "Eyes For You" single)
"Por Favor" – 3:36
"Sound of Running" – 3:03
"Eyes For You" – 2:56 (from "Eyes For You" single)
"Let the Train Blow the Whistle" – 2:54 (from "Crying Drunk" single)

Personnel
Ken Bethea – electric guitar
Murry Hammond – bass, vocals
Rhett Miller – acoustic guitar, vocals
Old 97's – producer
Philip Peeples – drums
Chuck Uchida – producer, engineer

Old 97's albums
2000 EPs
Bloodshot Records albums